Arina Rodionova and Storm Sanders were the defending champions having won the previous edition in 2019, however both players chose not to participate.

Valentina Ivakhnenko and Andreea Prisăcariu won the title, defeating Mona Barthel and Mandy Minella in the final, 6–3, 6–1.

Seeds

Draw

Draw

References
Main Draw

Solgironès Open Catalunya - Doubles